The year 1804 in archaeology involved some significant events.

Explorations

Excavations
 In southern France, the Ratapignata Pyramid (Aven de Ratapignata) is discovered on the hillside north of Nice, France and northwest of Falicon. It was determined to have been a Roman building 9-m (28-ft) tall. The stone pyramid is built atop the opening of the Grotto (Aven) of Ratapignata, on the eastern flank of the ridge. The grotto beneath the pyramid is a karstic cave, called Bauma des Ratapignata in Occitan, or "Cave of the Bats".

Finds

Publications

Births

Deaths

 August 4 - Karl Friedrich Hermann (d. 1855).

References

Archaeology
Archaeology by year
Archaeology
Archaeology